Dennis Brown is a retired Bermudian football player, nowadays working as a football manager.

Playing career

International
He has played for the Bermuda national football team. His final international match was a November 1992 FIFA World Cup qualification match against Canada.

Managerial career
He was a head coach of the SCC Trojan, leaving them for Devonshire Cougars in summer 2011.

Since 15 August 2012 he coached the Bermuda national football team together with Andrew Bascome. In October 2013 he was named coach of Bermuda U-20 while still coach of Cougars.

He won the so-called "Triple Crown" of Premier Division, FA Cup and Friendship Trophy with Cougars in the 2012/13 season. In April 2014 Brown resigned as coach of Devonshire Cougars to focus on his own football school and the Bermuda U-20's. He later returned to Somerset Trojans in the role of technical director.

References

External links

Year of birth missing (living people)
Living people
Bermudian footballers
Bermuda international footballers
Bermudian football managers
Bermuda national football team managers
Place of birth missing (living people)
Association football defenders